Sultan Muhanmed II Sri Bavana Mahaa Radhun was the Sultan of Maldives from 1467 to 1481, succeeding his father Sultan Hassan III to the throne. He is known as a cruel Sultan who ruled like his father.

15th-century sultans of the Maldives